Henry II, Count of Eu (died 1191), son of John, Count of Eu and Lord of Hastings, and Alice d'Aubigny. Henry inherited the countship of Eu and lordship of Hastings upon the death of his father (1170). 

Henry married Matilda, daughter of Hamelin de Warenne, Earl of Surrey, and Isabel de Warenne, 4th Countess of Surrey. Henry and Matilda had:
 Raoul of Eu (d. 1 May 1186)
 Guy of Eu (d. 1185)
 Alix, Countess of Eu, married in 1213 to Raoul I of Lusignan who became Count of Eu
 Jeanne of Eu.

Upon the death of Henry, his daughter became Countess of Eu and Lady of Hastings.  Henry was buried at Foucarmont.

References

Sources 

 
Eu
House of Blois